TV: Nippon Television
Radio: Radio Nippon in Tokyo

Broadcast announcers

TV analyst
Suguru Egawa
Tsuneo Horiuchi
Katsuhito Mizuno
Kiyoshi Nakahata

TV play-by-play
Satoshi Ebihara
Genta Aoki
Kentaro Hirakawa
Satoshi Kamige
Ryo Kawamura
Hironori Machida
Yoshihiko Murayama
Yasushi Shinya
Kenichiro Tanabe

Broadcasters